The Fawn Fire was a damaging wildfire near Redding, Shasta County, in the U.S. state of California in September and October 2021. Caused by a suspected act of arson in the evening of September 22, the fire began in mountains to the northeast of Redding and was driven by high winds the following day south and west into wildland-urban interface (WUI) neighborhoods. The fire ultimately destroyed 185 structures (including residences, commercial buildings, and outbuildings) and damaged 26. Three firefighters engaged in suppression of the fire were injured, but there were no recorded civilian injuries or fatalities. The fire cost more than $25 million to suppress and burned  before being fully contained on October 2. A Palo Alto woman was arrested the day of its ignition and charged with starting the fire. , legal proceedings were ongoing.

The Fawn Fire was one of the last and most destructive major wildfires of the 2021 California wildfire season, which was notable for its severity. The fire was also the latest in a string of destructive WUI wildfires in the Redding area in recent years, including the 1999 Jones Fire and the 2013 Clover Fire. Most infamously, in 2018 the Carr Fire killed multiple people and destroyed hundreds of structures on the western outskirts of the city and in the communities of Shasta, Keswick, and Centerville.

Events

Context 
Northern California experienced many large and destructive wildfires in the summer of 2021, all of them exacerbated by drought and prolonged heat waves such as the 2021 Western North America heat wave. Multiple fires burned in or near Shasta County, including the Salt Fire and the Dixie Fire. The immediate area had no significant or recent fire history, though the 1999 Jones Fire and 2004 Bear Fire burned a combined 37,000 acres and hundreds of structures in the Jones Valley region just to the east of the Fawn Fire's footprint.

September 22 
The fire began at approximately 4:45 p.m. PDT in the steep, forested drainage of the West Fork Stillwater Creek in the Shasta National Forest, west of Blue Ridge and south of Allie Cove Campground near Shasta Lake. The area, more generally located in the mountains between Redding's sparse northern fringes and Shasta Lake, was accessible only using nearby quarry roads. The fire's dispatched location was near the intersection of Fawndale Road (which gave the incident its name) and Radcliff Road, immediately to the east of Interstate 5 and between the community of Mountain Gate to the south and Shasta Lake to the north. At approximately 5:00 pm, Cal Fire reported that the fire was 20 acres and exhibiting a rapid rate of spread, burning in timber. By 6:30 p.m. the fire was 50 acres and 0% contained.

On the night of September 22, gusty north winds caused the fire to spot and spread rapidly.

September 23 
By 7:00 a.m. on the morning of September 23, the fire was reported as 150 acres and 5% contained. Winds continued to increase throughout the morning and afternoon. At the same time, the Shasta County Sheriff's Office issued the first evacuation warning for the fire, for the area north of Bear Mountain Road, from Kitty Hawk Lane to Moss Drive. An evacuation order was issued by 9:00 a.m. for all roads off of Bear Mountain Road between Dry Creek and Old Oregon Trail. By 9:20, the fire was reported as 800 acres and 5% contained, and by 12:30, it was reported as 1,200 acres and 5% contained.

The Fawn Fire's growth was fueled by a combination of high winds with gusts over 20 miles per hour, temperatures as high as 97 degrees, and a relative humidity down to 10%. The wind-driven fire exhibited "extreme" and "explosive" behavior as it moved primarily south and west out of the mountains towards Redding and into brush, oak woodlands, and neighborhoods, threatening more than 2,000 structures. 

At least 555 firefighting personnel were engaged on the fire using bulldozers to create firebreaks, water tenders to defend structures and attack spot fires, and over a dozen air tankers and helicopters dropping fire retardant and water in an effort to reduce the intensity and rate of spread of the fire. During the height of the air attack effort on September 23, 53,000 gallons of fire retardant were dropped in a 90-minute period. Evacuation warnings and orders continued to expand, eventually covering all areas east of Interstate 5 and north of State Route 299 (including Shasta College, which had briefly been an evacuation center).

Winds and fire behavior moderated in the afternoon and evening. By 7:00 p.m. the fire was reported as 5,500 acres and 5% contained.

September 24 onwards 
On the morning of September 24 the fire was reported as 5,850 acres and 10% contained, with 9,000 structures threatened and 950 personnel involved in the firefight. The Fawn Fire was rated by the National Interagency Fire Center (NIFC) as the No. 1 priority wildfire incident in the nation, due to the immediate threat to life and property, as well as reduced resource needs for fires elsewhere in the country. That day, the fire grew by another thousand acres, primarily to the east and west along its flanks. On the morning of September 25 the fire was assessed at 7,544 acres, remaining 10% contained. On the morning of September 26, the fire was assessed at 8,537 acres, with 35% containment. At this point, during the peak of the fire suppression effort, over 2,000 personnel were assigned to the incident. The fire exhibited minimal growth after this point, and fire crews continued to strengthen containment lines in advance of a red flag warning issued for September 28. Containment slowly increased until the Fawn Fire was declared 100% contained at 6:53 pm. PDT on October 2, 10 days after it began.

Impacts 
The Fawn Fire ultimately destroyed 185 structures, including homes, commercial buildings, and outbuildings; a complete breakdown of how many of each were destroyed was not made available, but at least 41 residential buildings burned. A further 26 structures were damaged.

At some point during the fire suppression effort three firefighters were injured; Cal Fire did not disclose the cause or severity of their injuries. No civilians were reported injured, and no fatalities of any kind were reported.

On September 23, the state of California applied for a Fire Management Assistance Grant for the Fawn Fire. The Federal Emergency Management Agency (FEMA) approved it, allowing up to 75% of eligible firefighting costs to be covered by federal funding. On September 27, Governor of California Gavin Newsom declared a state of emergency for Shasta County in response to the Fawn Fire, having previously declared a state of emergency in the county on August 10 for the McFarland Fire.

Following the fire, Mercy Medical Center Redding requested the activation and received the assistance of two National Guard medical teams after hospital staffing was compromised by the combined impacts of the Fawn Fire (which affected 30 hospital employees) and the COVID-19 pandemic.

Cause

Arrest 
A woman was apprehended after walking out of a wooded area near the fire's ignition point after it started. According to officials, she told firefighters that she was dehydrated and needed medical care. After receiving it, she was interviewed by Cal Fire law enforcement officers, arrested, and booked into the Shasta County Jail. She was allegedly found with an operable lighter, carbon dioxide cartridges, and a "pink and white item containing a green leafy substance". 

The supervisor of a quarry near both the ignition point and the site of the woman's arrest reported someone of her description trespassing in the area, ignoring warnings to that effect, and leaving a battery and more carbon dioxide cartridges on a dirt road. The woman claimed she had been unsuccessfully attempting to boil water containing bear urine in a puddle in a creek bed.

Legal proceedings 
Later identified as Alexandra Andreevna Souverneva of Palo Alto, California, on September 24, 2021, the woman was charged by the Shasta County District Attorney's office with felony arson to wildland (Cal. Penal Code § 451(C)), with an enhancement because of the declared state of emergency in California (Cal. Penal Code § 454(A)). During her arraignment, Souverneva entered a plea of not guilty. Judge Adam Ryan increased her bail from $100,000 to $175,000 on account of the enhancement and the damage the fire had already caused by that point.

In November 2021 Judge Ryan found Souverneva mentally unfit to stand trial and put the prosecution on hold. After undergoing competency training in the custody of the California Department of State Hospitals, in April 2022 Souverneva was found fit to stand trial. The preliminary hearing for the trial is scheduled for September 14, 2022. If convicted, Souverneva faces up to 9 years in California state prison.

During the initial press conference announcing Souverneva's arrest, Shasta County District Attorney Stephanie Bridgett said Souverneva may be linked to other blazes in the county and elsewhere in California, but no other information has been released since regarding that point. Over 100 people were arrested for arson in California in 2021, including at least 14 in Shasta County.

Fire progression

See also 
 Delta Fire (a large 2018 wildfire north of Lake Shasta, also caused by arson)

References

External links 
 Official Cal Fire Fawn Fire Incident page
 Official Cal Fire Fawn Fire Status Update Reports
 Official Fawn Fire Structure Status Map

2021 California wildfires
September 2021 events in the United States
Wildfires in Shasta County, California
California wildfires caused by arson
Shasta-Trinity National Forest